The Legendary Live Tapes: 1978–1981 is a four-CD live recording of Weather Report on Columbia, Sony, released on November 20, 2015. Discs one and three are quintet recordings from 1980 to 1981, while discs two and four are quartet recordings from 1978. Most of the music was recorded on analog tape by the band's then drummer (and producer of this live album) Peter Erskine and front of house mixing engineer Brian Risner. In the liner notes, Erskine provides insight into Weather Report's live performances and life on tour via a song by song discussion.

Track listing

Personnel
 Joe Zawinul – keyboards; ARP Quadra synthesizer bass (Disc 1 / tracks 1, 3); acoustic piano (Disc 2 / track 1); "Chicken Neck" (Disc 1 / track 8)
 Wayne Shorter – saxophones
 Jaco Pastorius – fretless bass; drums (Disc 1 / track 1)
 Peter Erskine – drums, timpani (Disc 2 / track 3)
 Robert Thomas Jr. – hand drums (Discs 1 and 3)

Technical
 Peter Erskine - producer
 Tony Zawinul - executive producer
 Brian Risner - live engineer / editing
 Rich Breen - mastering
 Jim Lane - product direction
 Tara Master - project direction
 Jeff Gilligan - art direction, design
 Shigeru Uchiyama - cover photo

Chart performance

References

External links
  Weather Report - The Legendary Live Tapes: 1978-1981 (2015) album releases & credits at Discogs

2015 live albums
Weather Report albums
Live jazz fusion albums
Columbia Records live albums